The Belfast City Marathon takes place in Belfast in Northern Ireland. The organisers describe it as the "largest mass sport participatory event in Northern Ireland" with between 15,000 and 18,000 participants taking part in several events. These events, typically scheduled over the May bank holiday weekend, include marathon, wheelchair race, team relay and 8-mile walk events. The organisers also stage Northern Ireland's largest half marathon event, which takes place annually in September.

Marathon 

The Belfast City Marathon is an AIMS certified race. The race traditionally starts at Stormont Estate at 9am and finishes in Ormeau Park.

5,000 runners took part in the 2019 "full marathon". Following this event, organisers apologised after it was noted that the course was 0.3 miles longer than the typical marathon standard.

The 2020 edition of the race was cancelled as a response to the COVID-19 pandemic in Northern Ireland, with all registrants given the option of either running the race virtually or transferring their entry to 2021, 2022 or 2023. The 2021 event was rescheduled from May to October 2021.

Previously sponsored by Deep River Rock, the 2022 event (scheduled for May 2022) was reported to be Mash Direct.

Half marathon 

First launched in 2013, the Belfast City Half Marathon is an extension of the May Marathon event. The race starts at Ormeau Park.

Winners

References

External links

 

Sport in Belfast
Recurring sporting events established in 1982
Athletics competitions in Northern Ireland
Marathons in the United Kingdom
1982 establishments in Northern Ireland
Spring (season) events in Northern Ireland